Kenneth Sherwood was an American curler. He played third on the Granite Curling Club team (from Seattle, Washington, United States) during the World Curling Championships known as the 1961 Scotch Cup. His team finished third out of the three teams competing.

In 1996 he was inducted to United States Curling Hall of Fame.

References

External links

American male curlers
Living people 
Year of birth missing (living people)
Place of birth missing (living people)
American curling champions